Djehutyemhat, or Thotemhat, was an ancient Egyptian ruler ("king") of Hermopolis during the 25th Dynasty.

Biography
Like his probable predecessor Nimlot, he proclaimed himself king, adopting the full royal titulary although he was no more than a governor of Hermopolis and a vassal of the Kushite 25th Dynasty. His cartouches appear carved on the shoulders of a damaged block statue depicting the priest Tjanhesret, found in Luxor in 1909 and now in the Cairo Museum (CG 42212), and on a bronze naos-shaped amulet of Amun-Ra of unknown provenance – possibly from Thebes – and now in the British Museum (EA11015). The only known depiction of the king is found on a votive scribal pallet now in the collection of the Egypt Centre of Swansea University.

British Egyptologist Kenneth Kitchen has suggested that the successor of Djehutyemhat could have been the poorly known "king" Pedinemty.

Notes

References

8th-century BC Pharaohs
People of the Twenty-fifth Dynasty of Egypt
Non-dynastic pharaohs